Ernest Harold "Benny" Bailey (August 13, 1925 – April 14, 2005) was an American jazz trumpeter.

Biography
A native of Cleveland, Ohio, Bailey briefly studied flute and piano before turning to trumpet. He attended the Cleveland Conservatory of Music. He was influenced by Cleveland native Tadd Dameron and had a significant influence on other Cleveland musicians, such as Albert Ayler, Bob Cunningham, Bobby Few, Bill Hardman, and Frank Wright. Bailey played with Tony Lovano, father of Joe Lovano.

In the early 1940s he worked with Bull Moose Jackson and Scatman Crothers. He later worked with Dizzy Gillespie and toured with Lionel Hampton. During a European tour with Hampton he remained in Europe and spent time in Sweden, where he worked with Harry Arnold's big band. He preferred big bands over small groups, and he became associated with several big bands in Europe, including the Kenny Clarke/Francy Boland Big Band. His time with Quincy Jones led to a brief return to the United States in 1960. He was invited to the studio as part of Freddie Redd's sextet to record Redd's Blues after meeting the pianist during a tour in Sweden, and played at the 1960 Newport Jazz Festival. He returned to Europe, first to Germany, then the Netherlands, where he settled permanently.

In 1969 he played on Eddie Harris and Les McCann's album Swiss Movement, recorded live at the Montreux Jazz Festival, although it was not his usual style of music. In 1988 he worked with British clarinetist Tony Coe and recorded albums until 2000 when he was in his mid-70s.

Bailey died at home in Amsterdam on April 14, 2005.

Discography

As leader 
 Quincy - Here We Come (Metronome, 1959) also released as The Music of Quincy Jones by Argo in 1961
 Big Brass (Candid, 1960)
 Soul Eyes (MPS 1968)
 Folklore in Swing  (MPS, 1966)
 The Balkan in My Soul (MPS, 1968)
 Soul Eyes: Jazz Live at the Domicile Munich (MPS 1968)
 Mirrors (The Amazing Benny Bailey) (Freedom 1971)
 Islands (Enja 1976)
 Serenade to a Planet (Ego, 1976)
 East of Isar with Sal Nistico (Ego, 1978)
 Grand Slam (Jazzcraft, 1978)
 While My Lady Sleeps (Gemini, 1990)
 No Refill (TCB, 1994)
 Angel Eyes (Laika, 1995)
 Peruvian Nights (TCB, 1996)
 I Thought About You (Laika, 1996)
 The Satchmo Legacy (Enja, 2000)

As sideman 
With Count Basie
Basie in Sweden (Roulette, 1962)

With Berlin Contemporary Jazz Orchestra
 Berlin Contemporary Jazz Orchestra (ECM, 1990)

With the Kenny Clarke/Francy Boland Big Band
 Jazz Is Universal (Atlantic, 1962)
 Handle with Care (Atlantic, 1963)
 Now Hear Our Meanin' (Columbia, 1965 [1963])
 Swing, Waltz, Swing (Philips, 1966)
 Sax No End (SABA, 1967)
 Out of the Folk Bag (Columbia, 1967)
 17 Men and Their Music (Campi, 1967)
 All Smiles (MPS, 1968)
 Faces (MPS, 1969)
 Latin Kaleidoscope (MPS, 1969)
 Fellini 712 (MPS, 1969)
 All Blues (MPS, 1969)
 More Smiles (MPS, 1969)
 Clarke Boland Big Band en Concert avec Europe 1 (Tréma, 1992 [1969])
 Off Limits (Polydor, 1970)
 November Girl with Carmen McRae (Black Lion, 1975 [1970])
 Change of Scenes  with Stan Getz (Verve, 1971)

With Eric Dolphy
 The Berlin Concerts (enja, 1961)

With Stan Getz
 Imported from Europe (Verve, 1958)

With Benny Golson
 Stockholm Sojourn (Prestige, 1964)

With Dexter Gordon
 Sophisticated Giant (Columbia, 1977)
 Revelation (SteepleChase, 1995 [1974])
The Rainbow People (Steeplechase, 2002 [1974])
Round Midnight (SteepleChase, 1991 [1974])

With Quincy Jones
 Quincy's Home Again (Metronome, 1958) - also released as Harry Arnold + Big Band + Quincy Jones = Jazz! (EmArcy)
 I Dig Dancers (Mercury, 1960)
 Quincy Plays for Pussycats (Mercury, 1965) – recorded in 1959-65
 Miles & Quincy Live at Montreux (Warner Bros., 1993) also with Miles Davis – recorded in 1991

With Billy Mitchell
 De Lawd's Blues (Xanadu, 1980)

With Freddie Redd
 Redd's Blues (Blue Note, 1961)

With Charlie Rouse
 The Upper Manhattan Jazz Society (Enja, 1985 [1981])

With Sahib Shihab
 Companionship (Vogue Schallplatten, 1971 [1964-70])

With Randy Weston
 Uhuru Afrika (Roulette, 1960)

With Jimmy Witherspoon
 Some of My Best Friends Are the Blues (Prestige, 1964)

With Phil Woods
 Rights of Swing (Candid, 1961)

See also
 Vocalese, an album by Manhattan Transfer with a tribute song entitled "Meet Benny Bailey"

References

External links
BBC Radio 2
[ All Music]

1925 births
2005 deaths
Cleveland Institute of Music alumni
20th-century American musicians
20th-century trumpeters
African-American jazz musicians
American jazz trumpeters
American male trumpeters
Bebop trumpeters
Hard bop trumpeters
Candid Records artists
Enja Records artists
Cadet Records artists
20th-century American male musicians
American male jazz musicians
Kenny Clarke/Francy Boland Big Band members
20th-century African-American musicians
21st-century African-American people